Parhat Azimat (Uyghur: ﭘﺎﺭﮬﺎﺕ ﺋﺎﺯﺋﻤﺎﺕ; ; born February 17, 1976) is a retired Chinese football player. He was born and raised in his native Xinjiang. He is currently a manager at China League Two side Xinjiang Sport Lottery.

Honours

Club

FC Kairat
Kazakhstan Premier League Champions(1):1992
Kazakhstan Cup Champions(1):1992

Dalian Wanda FC
Chinese Jia-A League Champions(1):1994

Xiamen Yuanhua
Chinese Jia-B League Champions(1):1999

References

1976 births
Living people
People from Ürümqi
Uyghur sportspeople
Chinese people of Uyghur descent
Chinese footballers
Footballers from Xinjiang
Chinese expatriate footballers
Expatriate footballers in Kazakhstan
FC Kairat players
Dalian Shide F.C. players
Association football central defenders
Foshan Fosti F.C. players